Lady Elgin may refer to:

 Lady Elgin, the wife of the Earl of Elgin
 Mary Louisa Lambton, the second wife of James Bruce, 8th Earl of Elgin
 PS Lady Elgin, a steamship named in honour of Mary Louisa Lambton